Hesperochiron is a small genus of plants in the waterleaf family containing two species native to western North America. These are thick-rooted perennial herbs growing in squat patches at ground level and producing bluish-white flowers with yellow throats. They grow in wet areas such as seepy meadows.

The species are generally similar in appearance, with oblong green leaves up to 7 or 8 centimeters long and 2 to 3 wide, often coated with tiny hairs. Hesperochiron californicus, the California hesperochiron, produces slightly larger flowers than the dwarf hesperochiron, Hesperochiron pumilus.

H. pumilus resembles wild strawberry, but has only five stamens and distinct elliptical leaves. They bloom briefly in early spring in the sagebrush steppe.

References

External links
Jepson Manual Treatment
Photos: H. californicus
Photos: H. pumilus

Hydrophylloideae
Flora of the California desert regions
Flora of the Sierra Nevada (United States)
Flora of the West Coast of the United States
Flora of the Western United States
Boraginaceae genera